Cephalogonimus vesicaudus Nickerson, 1912 is a species of digenean trematode parasite found in North America. This species typically infects the small intestine of North American soft shell turtles, but may also infect slider turtles, map turtles, mud turtles, green frogs, and ducks.

References 

 

Plagiorchiida
Animals described in 1912